Enka is an unincorporated community in Buncombe County, North Carolina, United States. It lies on U.S. Routes 19, 23, and 74 Business near the interchange of Interstates 26, 40, and 240.  It has a post office with the ZIP code 28728.

History

American Enka

The American Enka Company, incorporated in 1928, built what became the nation's largest rayon-producing factory.  The Dutch name of the rayon company was Nederlandse Kunstzijdefabriek, and it is from the Dutch phonetic pronunciation of the initial letters N and K of the firm's name that "Enka" is derived. The alternative explanation that Enka stands for "Eerste Nederlandse Kunstzijdefabriek Arnhem" is incorrect.  The Dutch company considered many sites and decided on the Hominy Valley because of its supply of water and labor. In 1929 the company began developing a community plan that included employee houses and became known as Enka Village.  Enka Village is now a historic community and is part of the city of Asheville.

Fred Loring Seely, an Asheville businessman and son-in-law of Edwin Wiley Grove (see Grove Park Inn) met several influential Dutch businessmen during his time in the Dutch colony of Java in 1901. Seely and his wife, Evelyn Grove Seely, had been sent to Java by Mr. Grove to secure a source for quinine which was used in Grove's famous malarial Chill Tonic. When the Dutch rayon businessmen were searching for a site for an American-based factory in 1928 Mr. Seely served as a liaison to lure ENKA to build the rayon fiber factory in Buncombe County. He told the ENKA owners that his county could supply trees for fiber, water for processing, and reliable manpower. The thousands of jobs created in western North Carolina in 1929 were lifesavers for many families. American Enka sent Mr. Seely over $1 million to buy 2000 acres, and ENKA built a $10 million plant. Nineteen hundred people worked there during the Great Depression, and that number grew to 4,300 after World War II. At one point, as many as 7,000 people worked there. Amenities included a gym, a pool room, a bowling alley, two cafeterias, and a library. Enka Lake Club opened on a lake built to supply the plant with water. Buses delivered employees from the surrounding area.

It was said that stricter environmental regulations led to a decline in rayon, and American Enka sold the plant to BASF in 1985. BASF sold the plant to Colbond Inc. in 2000, and as of 2007, rayon was no longer made. The northern section was sold to developers who tore down everything but the clock tower. Enka Lake is now part of the private Biltmore Lake HOA community;  Three buildings became the Enka campus of Asheville–Buncombe Technical Community College.

The future of Enka
Portions of the plant still stand, including a campus of Asheville-Buncombe Technical Community College. The remainder of the area includes Offices, warehouses and industrial areas, open space, and a greenway follows along Hominy Creek.

Though as of 2015 about 200 people worked for Bonar Inc. making fabric for commercial carpet backing and more space was leased to ten other companies, most of the former plant is gone. A school scheduled to open in 2016 will have 20,000 bricks from the plant, a clock tower recalling the one at the plant, and sloped roofs recalling the sawtooth design.

Included in Enka Center will be a warehouse and distribution center to be built by Samet Corp., for which a proposal is to be considered by the Asheville city council in January 2021. If Samet determines it is possible, the clock tower will be preserved.

References

External links
 Enka at the U.S. Geographic Names Information System

Unincorporated communities in Buncombe County, North Carolina
Asheville metropolitan area
Unincorporated communities in North Carolina
Populated places established in 1928
Company towns in North Carolina